Ercheia scotobathra is a species of moth of the family Erebidae. It is found in Indonesia (Buru).

References

Moths described in 1926
Ercheiini
Moths of Indonesia